John O'Sullivan was a Democratic member of the Illinois House of Representatives for a brief period between August 2010 to January 2011. He served on the Vehicle Safety committee. He is the Democratic Committeeman for Worth Township. He has been the Committeeman since 2010, when he ousted incumbent Dennis Magee. He is a member of Laborers' International Union of North America Chicago Local 2.

As of 2019, O'Sullivan is the current Worth Township Supervisor.

References

External links
 Profile at Illinois General Assembly

Year of birth missing (living people)
Living people
People from Oak Lawn, Illinois
Democratic Party members of the Illinois House of Representatives